Fabián Peña González (born 19 June 1973) is a Mexican former footballer who played as a midfielder.

A product of the Tigres UANL youth system, playing his debut during the 1995-96 season, Peña spent a total of six years at the club before a move to Mexico City-based Necaxa at the turn of the 21st century. After a brief return to Monterrey (this time with UANL Tigres' chief rivals - CF Monterrey) in 2002, Peña returned to Necaxa, which had since found a new home in Aguascalientes. In 2006, the 33-year-old made a high-profile move to Necaxa's sister club, Club América. Peña was able to join the ten-time league champion side prior to the Apertura 2006 season due to the departures of midfielders Pável Pardo and Francisco Torres to Germany's VfB Stuttgart and Santos Laguna, respectively.

External links
Official Club América Website (In Spanish)
Stats/Profile (In Spanish)
Consultor de Marketing

1973 births
Living people
Club Puebla players
Tigres UANL footballers
Club Necaxa footballers
C.F. Monterrey players
Club América footballers
Mexican footballers
Sportspeople from Nuevo Laredo
Association football midfielders